Joanna is a 1925 American silent romantic comedy film produced and directed by Edwin Carewe and distributed by First National Pictures. The film was based on the short story "Joanna, of the Skirts Too Short and the Lips Too Red and the Tongue Too Pert" by Henry Leyford Gates. The film starred Dorothy Mackaill and Jack Mulhall, and it also marked the first motion picture appearance of Mexican actress Dolores del Río.

Plot
As described in a review in a film magazine, Joanna (Mackaill), a poor saleswoman in a swell establishment is suddenly notified that a million dollars has been placed to her credit. This gives her an entree into the fast wealthy set but results in alienating her real sweetheart, a struggling young architect. There follows an era of gay parties and reckless spending and in a couple of years the million is gone. Her wealthy admirer (Nicholson) makes a proposal without mentioning marriage and she almost kills him. She then learns it was an experiment resulting from a discussion among wealthy men as to whether the modern girl would remain "good" in the face of temptation after acquiring a taste of luxury, and she was selected because one of the men who formerly loved her mother believed in her. This man adopts her as his daughter and her sweetheart comes back to her.

Cast

Reception
A review noted that the film was similar to another that Mackaill had recently starred in. Both Chickie (1925) and Joanna deal with the experiences of a young woman with a regular job among the jazzy ultra-rich class, although the films tell the story from a different angles. Also, in both films Paul Nicholson was cast as the idle rich young man.

Preservation
With no prints of Joanna located in any film archives, it is a lost film.

See also
 Dolores del Río filmography

References

External links

1925 films
1925 romantic comedy films
American romantic comedy films
American silent feature films
American black-and-white films
Films directed by Edwin Carewe
Films based on short fiction
First National Pictures films
Lost American films
1925 lost films
1920s American films
Silent romantic comedy films
Silent American comedy films